Powerlifting was contested at the 2011 Parapan American Games from November 17 to 19 at the Weightlifting Forum in Guadalajara, Mexico.

Medal summary

Medal table

Medal events

Women

Men

External links
2011 Parapan American Games – Powerlifting

Events at the 2011 Parapan American Games